Bruton School for Girls was an independent day and boarding school for girls aged 2 to 18 located near Pitcombe in Bruton in south east Somerset, England.

By 2009 the school comprised Sunny Hill Nursery, Sunny Hill Prep, a senior school and sixth form with an overall attendance of approximately 250 pupils, of whom a third were boarders. A small number of boys also attended the Pre-school and pre-prep.

History 
Bruton School for Girls celebrated its centenary in 2001. The school was founded as a private day and boarding school and named Sunny Hill School. In 1911 it became a public secondary school and received an annual endowment from the Hugh Sexey’s Charity and grants from Somerset County Council. After the passing of the 1944 Education Act, Sunny Hill School became fully independent. In 1961, the school changed its name to Bruton School for Girls and in 1997 extended its Junior Department to take students from age 2.

The school motto was "Follow the Gleam".

The final Headmistress was Jane Evans, with Deputy Head Rachel Robbins.

In March 2022, the school joined The King's School, Bruton Foundation. In May 2022, the foundation announced that Bruton School for Girls would close permanently at the end of the academic year.

Notable former pupils

 Helen Roberts, awarded MBE in 2001 for services to eye care in East Africa after setting up a successful eye clinic in Kenya
 Emily Eavis, co-organiser of the Glastonbury Festival
 Viv Groskop, columnist and journalist
 Patricia Moberly, public servant and former teacher

Arms

References

Further reading

External links
Bruton School for Girls Website
Bruton Friends Website

Boarding schools in Somerset
Educational institutions established in 1901
Girls' schools in Somerset
Defunct schools in Somerset
Educational institutions disestablished in 2022
1901 establishments in England

Bruton
2022 disestablishments in England